Nasim Nisr (also spelled Nissim Nasser; ; ; born 1968), is a Lebanese and former Israeli citizen who was convicted of spying for Hezbollah.

Biography
Nisr was born in Lebanon in 1968 to a Muslim father and a Jewish mother who converted to Islam after her marriage. In 1982, Nisr moved to Israel and obtained Israeli citizenship under the Law of Return. He lived in Holon, and was married with two daughters. His immediate family remained behind in Lebanon.

Nisr established ties with a Hezbollah agent through his brother in Lebanon. He was asked to supply maps of Tel Aviv marking electricity and gas installations, to extract intelligence from a top Israeli military officer, and to monitor the activities of Israeli armor near Ramallah.

He was arrested in 2002, tried and convicted of spying for Hezbollah, and sentenced to six years in prison in a plea bargain. During his imprisonment, he gave up his Israeli citizenship, hoping to be included in a prisoner exchange deal. His release in a prisoner exchange was a Hezbollah demand during the 2006 Lebanon War, which Israel refused. However, on 1 June 2008, he was deported to Lebanon as part of a prisoner exchange for the body parts of Israeli soldiers killed during the war.

See also
2008 Israel-Hezbollah prisoner swap

References

2006 Lebanon War
Hezbollah members
Lebanese people imprisoned abroad
Prisoners and detainees of Israel
Israeli people of Lebanese descent
People from South Lebanon
Living people
People convicted of spying
Israeli Jews
Year of birth missing (living people)